"They Rage On" is a song co-written and recorded by American country music singer Dan Seals. It was released in February 1989 as the third and final single from his album Rage On.  It peaked at #5 on the Billboard country charts in June 1989, thus breaking his streak of number-one hits.  It was his first single to miss the #1 spot since his early-1985 single "My Old Yellow Car", which peaked at #9.  The song was written by Seals and Bob McDill.

Music video
The music video was directed by Neil Abramson. This video, in particular, played on the song's theme of the irony of small-town values with the depiction of an inter-racial relationship. In it, a white teen-aged boy falls in love with an Asian girl, angering the boy's friends to the point they vandalize the boy's car; one boy attempts to assault the girl's father by hurling a beer bottle at him (the bottle misses).

Chart positions

Year-end charts

References
 

1989 singles
Dan Seals songs
Songs written by Bob McDill
Songs written by Dan Seals
Song recordings produced by Kyle Lehning
Capitol Records Nashville singles
1988 songs